Manoranjitham, the climbing ylang-ylang, is a shrub found in India through to Burma, southern China and Taiwan, having flowers that are renowned for their exotic fragrance. It is also called ylang-ylang vine or tail grape in English, with a variety of names in other languages. The yellow colored flowers of this plant are very fragrant. The flowers are greenish in the beginning and turn yellow with age and the flowers are long lasting with fruity pleasant smell. When young it is a shrub which turns into a climber once attains the height of about 2 meters.

It is a large woody climber or half-scandent shrub originated in South China, Burma (Myanmar), the Philippines and India.  Its flowers are axillary, solitary, or in clusters of two or three, greenish yellow in color when ripe and give a strong smell resembling that of ripened jackfruit. Hence its name in Bengali is 'Kanthali champa' (jackfruit-champa). It flowers almost all the year round but more during the summer and the rains. It is unsuitable for small gardens because of its huge size. It needs pruning to keep it in shape. Propagation is from seeds or layers.

Gallery

See also 
Cananga odorata, tree which is the source of ylang-ylang oil.
Desmos chinensis, dwarf ylang-ylang.

References

External links
 Photos
 Description with sketch
 Description

Annonaceae